Norberto Bravo (born December 4, 1970) is an American professional boxer, and is a contestant on the ESPN reality show Contender Season 2.

Early life
Bravo was born in Tucson, Arizona.

Professional career
In the amateur ranks, Bravo posted 120 wins in 130 fights.  He became a professional at age 20, and once fought Ishe Smith, a contestant on the first Contender, losing a unanimous decision in 6 rounds at the Orleans Hotel and Casino. His one no-decision came about as both he and the other boxer continued to fight after the closing bell in a 4 round bout.

The Contender
On the show Contender Season 2, Bravo was a member of the Blue Team.  He fought in the second contest of the first round, choosing to face Rudy Cisneros due to Cisneros' problems making weight for the upcoming bout.  Bravo won a split decision, with judge Max DeLuca scoring 49-46 Bravo, judge Lou Moret scoring 48-47 Cisneros, and judge Fritz Warner scoring 49-46 Bravo.

In the last fight of the second round, Bravo defeated Gary Balletto by unanimous decision. Bravo lost to Grady Brewer in the semifinals, despite knocking Brewer down in the first round. In the bronze medal fight against Cornelius Bundrage, Norberto lost by TKO in the seventh round.

He then went on to a 1st round TKO defeat to Andre Berto.

Professional boxing record

Personal life
Bravo suffers from colorblindness. He currently lives in Tucson, is engaged with four children, and works in construction in addition to boxing.

References

External links

American boxers of Mexican descent
Boxers from Arizona
Light-middleweight boxers
Middleweight boxers
1970 births
Living people
The Contender (TV series) participants
American male boxers